'Abu Bakr Muhammad at-Turtushi (1059 – 1126 CE; 451 AH – 520 AH ), better known as At-Turtushi was one of the most prominent Andalusian political philosophers of the twelfth century. His book Kitāb Sirāj al-Mulūk (The Lamp of Kings) was one of the most important works of political theory to be produced in the medieval Islamic world. At-Turtushi was also an accomplished jurist in the Maliki school.

Life
ِAbu Bakr was born in Tortosa in 1059 in the northern region of Al-Andalus at the Ebro Delta, at a time when the region had become increasingly fragmented and was divided into various taifa kingdoms. He first traveled to Zaragoza, where he became a student under Abu al-Walid al-Baji, a famous scholar and poet. While in Spain, he also familiarised himself with the philosophical and political treatises of the Andalusian polymath Ibn Hazm.

He travelled for knowledge, seeking to educate himself from various scholars in different part of the Muslim world and went as far east as Baghdad. On his way he also stopped at Damascus, Aleppo, Cairo, and Alexandria. He eventually settled in Fatimid Alexandria, where he taught at a madrassa. At-Turtushi strongly opposed the Ismaili ideology of the Fatimid dynasty in Egypt. He also issued a fatwa for Yusuf Ibn Tashfin, the Almoravid ruler of Al-Andulus (Muslim Spain) that allowed him to invade Spain and depose of the divided Taifa kingdoms. His most famous work was Siraj al-Muluk (سراج الملوك) (The Lamp of Kings) an important treatise on political theory.

See also

 List of Ash'aris and Maturidis

References

External links
Tartushi

1126 deaths
1059 births
11th-century philosophers
Asharis
Spanish Muslims
Maliki scholars from al-Andalus
Islamic philosophers
Political philosophers
Arab political philosophers
Islamic mirrors for princes
11th-century jurists
12th-century jurists
Philosophers from al-Andalus